Harmakhis Vallis is a valley near Hellas Planitia, Mars. It has been identified as an outflow channel, the site of catastrophic floods of water during Mars' past.

Gullies are also common on the wall of Harmakhis Vallis, as seen the image below. Some authors have suggested these structures indicate geologically recent flow of small quantities of water across the surface.

See also
Dao Vallis
Reull Vallis

References

Further reading

External links
HiRISE image of Harmakhis Vallis wall

Valleys and canyons on Mars
Hellas quadrangle